Sri Lanka participated at the 16th Asian Games in Guangzhou, China.

Archery
Sri Lanka sent 5 archers for the multi-sport event including 3 men and 2 women archers.
Men
Indranath Perera
Chaminda Rajasinghe
Nipun Seneviratne

Women
Dilhara Salgado
Shashikala Kumarasinghe

Athletics
Sri Lanka sent 21 athletes for the competition.
Men
Manjula Kumara
Chaminda Wijekoon
Prasanna Amarasekara
KK Seneviratne
Nalin Priyantha
Keith de Mel
DN Karunaratne
Gayan Wickramasinghe
Rohitha Pushpakumara
Gihan Ratnayake
Shivantha Weerasuriya
Ashan Hasaranga

Women
Jani Chathurangani
Nadeeka Lakmali
Chamli Priyadarshani
Chandrika Rasnayake
Niluka Nadeeshani
Niranjani Abeywickrema
Sujani Buddhika

Badminton

Sri Lanka sent 4 badminton athletes including 2 men and women for the event.
Men
Niluka Karunaratne
Dinuka Karunaratne

Women
Thilini Jayasinghe

Beach Volleyball
Sri Lanka sent 2 men and women beach volleyball teams. 
Men
Asanka Pradeep & Pubudu Ekanayake
Mahesh Perera & Wasantha Ratnapala

Women
Sujeewa Withanange & Nirosha Gunasinghe
LS Somaratne & HN Lakmini

Boxing
Sri Lanka was scheduled to send 7 boxers (6 men and 1 women), but 3 men boxers withdrew from the competition. The 2010 Commonwealth Games gold medalist Manju Wanniarachchi also withdrew due to injury.

Men
Chaminda Tennakoon
Saman Priyadharshana Silva
PD Suresh

Women
Niranjala Senanayake

Cricket

Sri Lanka men's cricket team was eligible to participate in the competition as it was the first instance that cricket was included in an Asian Games event.

Despite the absence of main cricketing nation, India, Sri Lankan team was ranked at 4th place and couldn't able to receive any medal at the cricket competition. 
Roster
Jehan Mubarak
Jeevantha Kulatunga
Kaushalya Weeraratne
Chinthaka Jayasinghe
Indika de Saram
Nuwan Zoysa
Dilhara Lokuhettige
Kaushal Lokuarachchi
Dilshan Munaweera
T.M. Sampath
Kusal Perera
Isuru Udana
Sajeewa Weerakoon
Gayan Wijekoon
Malinga Bandara

Cycling
Sri Lanka sent 2 cyclists for the event.

Road
Men
Lakshman Wijeratne

Women
Lasanthi Gunathilaka

Golf

Sri Lanka sent 4 golfers, all men.
Mithun Perera
T Nadaraja
VB Ranaratna
KA Chandradasa

Gymnastics
Sri Lanka sent 2 male gymnasts.

Artistic
Men
Nadika Cooray
Tharindu Pathmaperuma

Kabbadi

Women
Team

However, according to the official Olympic Committee website, Kabbadi was not listed as a sport being competed by Sri Lanka.

Karate

Sri Lanka sent one male karate athlete.

Men
RJ Edward

Rowing

Sri Lanka sent only 2 rowers for the Asian Games.

Men
Rajeev De Silva- Single and Double Sculls
Guyan Jayaratne- Double Sculls

Rugby sevens

Sri Lanka's men's team consisted of 12 players.

Sailing

Sri Lanka sent 4 sailors for the Asian Games including 3 male sailors and a woman sailor.

Men
DA de Alwis
Janaka Pathirage
CL Gunawardena

Women
Sureni Alapatha

Shooting

Sri Lanka sent 4 male shooters.

Men
Edirisinghe Senanayake
Sarath Chandrasiri
Mangala Samarakoon
Yamith Krishantha

Squash

Sri Lanka sent a delegation consisting of men's squash team.

Men
Navin Samarasinghe
Gihan Suwaris
Binura Jayasuriya

Swimming

Sri Lanka sent 2 swimmers for the multi-sporting event.

Men
Heshan Unamboowe

Women
Madhawee Weerathunga

Synchronized swimming

Elisha Gomes
Dehara Katipearachchi

Taekwondo

Sri Lanka sent 2 competitors for taekwondo.
Men
Ravindra Rajapaksa
Gayan Kumara

Table tennis

Sri Lanka sent 2 paddlers.

Men
Rohan Sirisena

Women
Ishara Madurangi

Tennis

Sri Lanka sent 3 male tennis players.

Men
Harshana Godamanna
Thangarajah Dineshkanthan
Vimukthi de Alwis

Weightlifting

Sri Lanka sent 2 male weightlifters as a part of the 2010 Asian Games. However the team will not include Suresh Peris or Chintana Vindange medal winners at the 2010 Commonwealth games.

Men
Priyantha Wijesuriya
Chaturanga Dissananyake

Wushu

Sri Lanka sent only one wushu competitor for the event.

Men
ID Abeyratne

References

Nations at the 2010 Asian Games
2010
Asian Games